(The) Real Deal may refer to:

Television
 The Real Deal (TV series), retitled The Real Estate Pros, a U.S. reality show
 Dickinson's Real Deal, a UK modern antiques and collectables programme
 Real Deal (American TV series), an American version of Dickinson's Real Deal
 "The Real Deal" (Agents of S.H.I.E.L.D.), an episode

Music

Albums
 Real Deal (album), by David Murray and Milford Graves (1994)
 The Real Deal (Isley Brothers album) (1982)
 The Real Deal: Greatest Hits Volume 2, by Stevie Ray Vaughan (1999)
 Untilted - The Real Deal, by Autechre (2005)
 The Real Deal (Smokey Wilson album) (1995)
 The Real Deal (Edgar Winter album) (1996)

Songs
 "Real Deal" (song), by Jessie J. (2017)
 "Real Deal", by The Feeling from The Feeling (2016)
 "Real Deal", by Tyga (2014)
 "The Real Deal", by Hoodoo Gurus from Electric Chair (1998)
 "The Real Deal", by Sammy Hagar from Ten 13 (2000)
 "The Real Deal", by Mike Denver with George Jones (2008)

Other
 a nickname for boxer Evander Holyfield
 a nickname for baseball pitcher J.D. Durbin
 Real Deal (comics)
 The Real Deal (magazine), New York-based real estate magazine
 TheRealDeal, darknet market part of the cyber-arms industry